Fred Johnson may refer to:

Musicians
Fred Johnson, bass player in the doo-wop band The Marcels
Fred Johnson, former second guitarist in the prog-rock band Minibosses
Fred Johnson, former member of the British band Radical Dance Faction
Fred Johnson, former member of the ska band Suburban Legends

Sportspeople
Fred Johnson (American football coach), American collegiate football head coach in 1911 and 1917
Fred Johnson (athlete), track and field athlete, 1948 US National and 1949 NCAA champion long jump
Fred Johnson (Australian footballer) (1896–1956), Australian rules footballer
Fred Johnson (baseball) (1894–1973), Major League Baseball pitcher
Fred Johnson (offensive lineman) (born 1997), American football offensive lineman
Fred Johnson (racing driver) (born 1929), American NASCAR driver, see list of former NASCAR drivers

Others
Fred Johnson (actor) (1899–1971), Irish actor featuring in Martin Luther and The Saint's Return
Fred Johnson (TV writer), writer and producer for TV series such as My Brother and Me, The Bernie Mac Show, Moesha and 227
Fred Gustus Johnson (1876–1951), U.S. congressman and Lieutenant Governor of Nebraska
Fred G. Johnson (1892–1990), American circus banner painter
J. Fred Johnson Jr. (1925–2012), American businessman and politician in Tennessee

Characters
Mr. Johnson (Sesame Street), a Sesame Street character, known for being unsuccessfully served by Grover
Fred Johnson, a character in the film Marching Out of Time
Fred Johnson, the One-Armed Man in the TV series The Fugitive
Fred Johnson, a character played by Ken Campbell in the BBC sitcom In Sickness and in Health
Fred Johnson, a character in the book and TV series The Expanse

See also
Fred or Frederick Johnston (disambiguation)
Freddie Johnson (1878–unknown), English footballer
Freddy Johnson (1904–1961), American jazz musician and singer
Frederick Johnson (disambiguation)
John Frederick Johnston (1876–1948), aka "Fred" Johnson, Canadian politician